Phalacrotophora is a genus of scuttle flies (insects in the family Phoridae). There are at least 50 described species in Phalacrotophora.

Species
These 57 species belong to the genus Phalacrotophora:

Phalacrotophora amplectens Borgmeier, 1961
Phalacrotophora appendicigera Borgmeier, 1924
Phalacrotophora auranticolor Schmitz, 1932
Phalacrotophora berolinensis Schmitz, 1920
Phalacrotophora beuki Disney, 1997
Phalacrotophora boliviana Borgmeier, 1971
Phalacrotophora braunsi (Brues, 1907)
Phalacrotophora bruesiana Enderlein, 1912
Phalacrotophora brunnescens Borgmeier, 1961
Phalacrotophora decimaculata Liu, 2001
Phalacrotophora delageae Disney, 1979
Phalacrotophora epeirae (Brues, 1902)
Phalacrotophora fasciata (Fallén, 1823)
Phalacrotophora fimbriiterga Beyer, 1966
Phalacrotophora flaviclava (Brues, 1911)
Phalacrotophora flexivena Borgmeier, 1961
Phalacrotophora gigantea Beyer, 1966
Phalacrotophora gressitti Beyer, 1966
Phalacrotophora halictorum (Melander and Brues, 1903)
Phalacrotophora indiana Colyer, 1961
Phalacrotophora irregularis Brues, 1936
Phalacrotophora jacobsoni Brues, 1915
Phalacrotophora longifrons (Brues, 1906)
Phalacrotophora luteifascia Borgmeier, 1934
Phalacrotophora maculiterga Beyer, 1958
Phalacrotophora magnifica Borgmeier, 1962
Phalacrotophora marginata (Brunetti, 1912)
Phalacrotophora nedae (Malloch, 1912)
Phalacrotophora neotropica Borgmeier, 1923
Phalacrotophora netropica Borgmeier, 1971
Phalacrotophora nigrita Schmitz, 1932
Phalacrotophora nitida Lengyel, 2011
Phalacrotophora oudemansi Schmitz, 1932
Phalacrotophora pallidicornis Brues, 1936
Phalacrotophora pappi Lengyel, 2011
Phalacrotophora paradoxa Schmitz, 1949
Phalacrotophora perlonga Beyer, 1966
Phalacrotophora petropolitana Borgmeier, 1925
Phalacrotophora philaxyridis Disney, 1997
Phalacrotophora pictofasciata Schmitz, 1919
Phalacrotophora pilipes Borgmeier, 1934
Phalacrotophora proclinans Beyer, 1965
Phalacrotophora pruinosa Borgmeier, 1934
Phalacrotophora puncifrons Brues, 24 g
Phalacrotophora punctiapex Borgmeier, 1961
Phalacrotophora punctifrons Brues, 1924
Phalacrotophora quadrimaculata Schmitz, 1926
Phalacrotophora quardrimaculata Schmitz, 1926
Phalacrotophora rufiventris Borgmeier, 1971
Phalacrotophora scutata Brues, 1936
Phalacrotophora spectabilis Schmitz, 1925
Phalacrotophora subnigrita Beyer, 1965
Phalacrotophora tesselata Borgmeier, 1971
Phalacrotophora triciliata Borgmeier, 1967
Phalacrotophora triguttata Beyer, 1965
Phalacrotophora vernicea Beyer, 1966
Phalacrotophora vittipennis Schmitz, 1932

References

Further reading

External links

 

Phoridae
Articles created by Qbugbot
Platypezoidea genera